George Weah Jr. (born August 27, 1987) is a former professional soccer player who most recently played as a midfielder for La Chaux-de-Fonds. He is the son of former Ballon d'Or winner and president of Liberia George Weah. Born in Liberia, he was capped for the United States men's national under-20 soccer team but has no international caps at senior level.

Early life 
Weah is the son of the former Ballon d'Or winner and current Liberian president George Weah and Jamaican-born wife Clar Weah. He was born in Liberia but raised in the United States. He was one of three Weah children to show an aptitude and interest in soccer at a young age. While his sister Tita chose to return to school studies, both he and his brother Tim pursued professional careers.

Club career 
Weah began his career in the youth team of AC Milan at the age of 14 but was released in 2007 after long series of injuries shortly prior to turning 20. In October of that year, he joined Slavia Prague on trial, but he was not offered a contract. Coach Karel Jarolím explained that the team were looking for a "different type of player" than Weah.

Weah briefly played for CS Romontois in Switzerland before moving within the country to Wohlen. In 2011, Weah joined Baden. On February 3, 2012, Weah joined Bulgarian club Kaliakra Kavarna on a one-and-a-half-year deal after a successful trial.

On May 17, 2014, Weah made his debut for Paris Saint-Germain's reserve team in the Championnat de France Amateur, coming on as an 87th-minute substitute in 2–0 defeat to Lens II. He went on to play two games in total for the PSG reserve side.

International career 
When he was active, Weah was eligible to represent both the United States and Liberia. He played in two friendlies for the United States under-20 side in 2004. More than a decade later, he was called up by the Liberian senior side for a 2017 Africa Cup of Nations qualification match against Togo in June 2015, despite not having played for a club in nearly a year. He was named to the bench as Liberia lost 2–1.

References

External links 

1987 births
Living people
Liberian footballers
American soccer players
United States men's youth international soccer players
Liberian people of Jamaican descent
American people of Liberian descent
American people of Jamaican descent
A.C. Milan players
FC Wohlen players
FC Baden players
FC Wangen bei Olten players
PFC Kaliakra Kavarna players
FC Lausanne-Sport players
Paris Saint-Germain F.C. players
Tours FC players
FC La Chaux-de-Fonds players
Swiss Super League players
First Professional Football League (Bulgaria) players
Expatriate footballers in Switzerland
Expatriate footballers in Bulgaria
Association football midfielders
Sportspeople from Monrovia
Children of national leaders
Weah family